16:9 is an aspect ratio widely used in television and video.

16:9 may also refer to

 16:9 (TV series), a Canadian newsmagazine show
 Minor seventh, a musical interval